Fred Hammer (7 March 1930 – 26 June 2020) was a Luxembourgian sprinter.  He competed in the 200 metres, 400 metres and 400 metres relay at the 1952 Summer Olympics, and the 200 metres and long jump at the 1956 Summer Olympics.

References

External links
 

1930 births
2020 deaths
Athletes (track and field) at the 1952 Summer Olympics
Athletes (track and field) at the 1956 Summer Olympics
Luxembourgian male sprinters
Luxembourgian male long jumpers
Olympic athletes of Luxembourg
Sportspeople from Luxembourg City